The University of Adelaide (informally Adelaide University) is a public research university located in Adelaide, South Australia. Established in 1874, it is the third-oldest university in Australia. The university's main campus is located on North Terrace in the Adelaide city centre, adjacent to the Art Gallery of South Australia, the South Australian Museum, and the State Library of South Australia.

The university has four campuses, three in South Australia: North Terrace campus in the city, Roseworthy campus at Roseworthy and Waite campus at Urrbrae, and one in Melbourne, Victoria. The university also operates out of other areas such as Thebarton, the National Wine Centre in the Adelaide Park Lands, and in Singapore through the Ngee Ann-Adelaide Education Centre.

The University of Adelaide is composed of three faculties, with each containing constituent schools. These include the Faculty of Sciences, Engineering and Technology (SET), the Faculty of Health and Medical Sciences, and the Faculty of Arts, Business, Law and Economics (ABLE). It is a member of the Group of Eight and the Association of Commonwealth Universities. The university is also a member of the Sandstone universities, which mostly consist of colonial-era universities within Australia.

The university is associated with five Nobel laureates, constituting one-third of Australia's total Nobel Laureates, and 114 Rhodes scholars. The university has generated a considerable impact on the public life of South Australia, having educated many of the state's leading businesspeople, lawyers, medical professionals and politicians. The university has been associated with many notable achievements and discoveries, such as the discovery and development of penicillin, the development of space exploration, sunscreen, the military tank, Wi-Fi, polymer banknotes and X-ray crystallography, and the study of viticulture and oenology.

History

The University of Adelaide was established on 6 November 1874 after a £20,000 donation by grazier and copper miner Walter Watson Hughes, along with support and donations from Thomas Elder.

The university's first chancellor was Sir Richard Hanson, and the first vice-chancellor was Augustus Short. The first degree offered was the Bachelor of Arts, and the university started teaching in March 1876. John Davidson was the first Hughes professor of English literature and mental and moral philosophy.

The university has a long history of championing the rights of women in higher education. It was the second university in the English-speaking world (after the University of London, 1878) to admit women on equal terms with men (1881), although women studied alongside men from the commencement of classes in 1876 and were equally eligible for all academic prizes and honours. Its first female graduate was Edith Emily Dornwell, who was also the first person in Australia to receive the degree of Bachelor of Science (BSc., 1885). The university also graduated Australia's first female surgeon Laura Fowler (MB, 1891). Ruby Davy (B.Mus., 1907; D.Mus., 1918) was the first Australian woman to receive a doctorate in music. The university was also the first to elect a woman to a university council in Australia, Helen Mayo (MBBS, 1902), in 1914.

The great hall of the university, Bonython Hall, was built in 1936 following a donation from the owner of The Advertiser newspaper, Sir John Langdon Bonython, who left £40,000 for a great hall for the university.

21st century
On 2 July 2010, the university officially implemented its "Smoke-Free Policy". This move was the culmination of an anti-smoking agenda headed by Professor Konrad Jamrozik and subsequently, following Jamrozik's death, the executive dean of the Faculty of Health Sciences, Professor Justin Beilby. Security have the right to eject people smoking within the university buildings and also fine people smoking in the gardens or walkways. It is the first higher education institution in South Australia to institute a smoke-free policy. The North Terrace campus has been smoke-free since July 2010; it was planned that the Waite and Roseworthy campuses would be smoke-free by 2011, and the university's residential facilities have also been made smoke-free.

In June 2018, the University of Adelaide and University of South Australia began discussions regarding the possibility of a merger. The proposition was described as the formation of a "super uni" by Steven Marshall and Simon Birmingham, but the merger was called off in October 2018. In 2022, the topic of a merger was raised again by the new government led by Peter Malinauskas, which proposed setting up a commission to investigate the possibility of a merger of the University of South Australia, the University of Adelaide and Flinders University. Staff's opinions were evenly divided on the idea of the commission.

The idea is now officially back on the table, with both universities agreeing to work on a feasibility study. The proposed new university would be called Adelaide University and open in 2026, with the aim of becoming the biggest Australian university for domestic students.

Campuses

North Terrace

The main campus of the university is on North Terrace. It is bordered by the Art Gallery of South Australia, the State Library of South Australia, the South Australian Museum and the "City East" campus of the University of South Australia. The Adelaide University Medical and Dental Schools were located across Frome Road, behind the old Royal Adelaide Hospital (now Lot Fourteen). The hospital moved to the western end of North Terrace and so have the schools; the Medical School North and South buildings were renamed Helen Mayo North and South from 1 January 2018, in honour of Helen Mayo, a doctor at the Royal Adelaide Hospital and a graduate of the University of Adelaide.

The vast majority of students and staff of the university are based at the North Terrace campus, where the majority of courses are taught and schools are based. The central administration of the university and the main library, the Barr Smith Library, are both located on this campus. While many other universities have law and business schools or satellite campuses within the central business district, the University of Adelaide is unique among Australian sandstone universities for having its main presence adjacent to the main business and shopping precinct.

Buildings
Bonython Hall, (the great hall of the university), the Mitchell Building, the Elder Hall, the Napier building and the Ligertwood building, form the North Terrace street frontage of the campus. Bonython Hall is one of the many historic and heritage listed buildings located at the North Terrace campus. Others include the Mitchell Building, Elder Hall, and the Reading Room of the Barr Smith Library.

The heritage-listed group of buildings known as the Union Buildings or Union Building Group include the Lady Symon Building, the George Murray Building, the Cloisters, Union House and the Western Annexe. The earlier Georgian-style buildings, including the Cloisters, the Lady Symon Building (named after the wife of Sir Josiah Symon) and the George Murray building (named after George John Robert Murray, vice-chancellor and later chancellor of the university), were designed by the architects Woods, Bagot, Jory and Laybourne-Smith (who also designed Bonython Hall, the Mitchell Gates and Johnson Laboratory, the Barr Smith Library and the Bentham Building) in 1929 and 1937. Later additions. The award-winning redevelopments in 1971 and 1975 known as Union House, including the Union Bookshop, were designed by Dickson & Platten and Robert Dickson & Associates respectively.

Masterplan (2016–)
The masterplan envisages new facilities for all schools, and greatly enhanced campus amenities for students, with a focus on pedestrians and cyclists, providing better, safer pathways through the campus, and eliminating vehicle traffic where possible. At North Terrace, the Schulz building will be repurposed as an on-campus residential college, with accommodation, and recreational facilities including a gym. This major transformation of the university's physical presence across all campuses comes in conjunction with the multimillion-dollar renewal and redevelopment of the old Royal Adelaide Hospital (RAH) site on North Terrace. In September 2017, the RAH moved to the western end of North Terrace, in the $4 billion South Australian Health and Biomedical Precinct (SAHBP), at which the University of Adelaide also has a physical presence in the form of the Adelaide Health and Medical Sciences Building.

Waite

The Waite campus has a strong focus on agricultural science, plant breeding and biotechnology. The School of Agriculture, Food and Wine is based on the Waite campus and the campus contains components of the School of Earth and Environmental Sciences. It is adjacent to the Urrbrae Agricultural High School.

A number of other organisations are co-located in the Waite Research Precinct, including the South Australian Research and Development Institute (SARDI) (which is part of Primary Industries and Regions SA (PIRSA), whose headquarters are also at the campus); Australian Grain Technologies; the Australian Wine Research Institute. the Commonwealth Scientific and Industrial Research Organisation (CSIRO); and the Australian Centre for Plant Functional Genomics (ACPFG).

A large amount of the land was donated in 1924 by the pastoralist Peter Waite. A large amount of money was donated by Rosina and John, the widow and son of William Tennant Mortlock. These donations were initially used to establish the Peter Waite Institute of Agricultural Research (first Director A. E. V. Richardson), which later became the Waite campus.

A Soil Research Centre was founded in 1929 with a donation of £10,000 from Harold Darling of J. Darling and Son, grain merchants.

In 2004, Premier Mike Rann opened the multimillion-dollar Plant Genomics Centre at the Waite campus. Then in 2010 Premier Rann opened The Plant Accelerator, a $30 million research facility – the largest and most advanced of its kind in the world.

Malcolm Oades was the director from November 1996 to 2001.

Roseworthy

Located north of the city, the Roseworthy campus comprises 16 km2 of farmland and is a large centre for agricultural research. It was the first agricultural college in Australia, established in 1883 and the first veterinary school in SA in 2008. Other organisations linked to the campus include SARDI and the Murray TAFE.

In 1991, the college merged with the University of Adelaide and became the university's Roseworthy campus, part of the Faculty of Agricultural and Natural Resource Sciences. The merger would see teaching and research in oenology and viticulture transferred to the university's Waite campus, along with the bulk of its work in plant breeding. Before the degree in oenology was transferred to the Waite campus, Roseworthy produced a number of highly regarded and awarded winemakers and wine critics.

From the mid-1990s, the major focus of the campus turned to dryland agriculture, natural resource management and animal production. The campus is also now home to South Australia's first veterinary science training program, which commenced in 2008. The new Veterinary Science Centre houses not only teaching facilities, including a surgical skills suite, but also a public veterinary clinic offering general practice as well as emergency and specialist veterinary services for pet animals. There are also specialised pathology laboratories in this centre for teaching, research and diagnostic work. In 2013, the veterinary science facilities were expanded with the opening of the Equine Health and Performance Centre, a state-of-the-art facility for equine surgery, sports medicine, internal medicine and reproduction.

Other locations

National Wine Centre

Located in the Adelaide Park Lands at the eastern end of North Terrace, the Wine Centre offers some of the university's oenology courses. Opened in 2001, the facility also hosts public exhibitions about winemaking and its industry in South Australia. It contains an interactive permanent exhibition of winemaking, introducing visitors to the technology, varieties and styles of wine. It also has a wine tasting area, giving visitors the opportunity to taste and compare wines from different areas of Australia.

The Wine Centre is situated at the eastern end of North Terrace, Adelaide in the eastern parklands and adjacent to the Adelaide Botanic Gardens. The building, designed by Cox Grieve Gillett, uses building materials to reflect items used in making wine.

Thebarton

Thebarton is the base of the university's Office of Industry Liaison. The precinct works in conjunction with the university's commercial partners. Commercial enterprises at Thebarton include businesses involved in materials engineering, biotechnology, environmental services, information technology, industrial design, laser/optics technology, health products, engineering services, radar systems, telecommunications and petroleum services. The flames for the Sydney and Athens Olympic Games were developed at the Thebarton campus by the TEC group.

Ngee Ann (Singapore)
The Ngee Ann – Adelaide Education Centre (NAAEC) was the University of Adelaide's first overseas centre. It was a joint venture with the Ngee Ann Kongsi foundation, started in 1998. In 2016, the University of Adelaide withdrew from the partnership, after about 3000 students had graduated over the 18 years of operation.

In 2018 the Singapore institution was rebranded as the Ngee Ann Academy, and in 2019 partnered with the University of Adelaide as well as three British universities.

Gallery

Residential colleges
The University of Adelaide, unlike most universities, did not set any land aside on its North Terrace campus for student accommodation, due mainly to an ideological opposition to the culture of live-in students, but also influenced by the small size of the original campus. However, demand for residential college accommodation led to the establishment of private colleges affiliated to the university. St. Mark's College was founded by the Anglican Church (then called the Church of England) in 1925, Aquinas College in 1950 by the Catholic Church, Lincoln College in 1952 by the Methodist Church, and later St Ann's College, Kathleen Lumley College and Australian Lutheran College. All are located within close walking distance of the university, across the River Torrens in North Adelaide. In addition to providing accommodation and meals for local, interstate and international students, each college organises academic support, social activities and sporting opportunities for its members.

Governance

In 2021, Peter Hoj commenced his tenure as 24th Vice-Chancellor, taking over from Peter Rathjen (2018–20) and Interim VC Mike Brooks (2017–18, 2020–21).

In May 2020, Rathjen commenced an indefinite leave of absence after University of Adelaide Chancellor Kevin Scarce resigned without public explanation the previous day. Later in the week, the Independent Commissioner Against Corruption (ICAC) confirmed he was investigating allegations of improper conduct by the Vice-Chancellor of the University of Adelaide. Rathjen, accused of engaging in "a personal relationship with a staff member", was succeeded by Acting Vice-Chancellor Mike Brooks. Rathjen formally resigned in July 2020, "due to ill health". In August 2020, the ICAC found that Rathjen had committed "serious misconduct" by sexually harassing two University of Adelaide colleagues, had lied to the then Chancellor Kevin Scarce, and also lied to the Commissioner in his evidence with respect to an investigation of sexual misconduct with a postgraduate student when he was employed at the University of Melbourne. The ICAC Commissioner Bruce Lander acknowledged there were "further issues" in the full 170-page report on the investigation which he chose not to release due to privacy concerns surrounding the victims, instead releasing an abridged 12-page version 'Statement about an Investigation: Misconduct by the Vice-Chancellor of the University of Adelaide'. In determining his findings, the Commissioner relied in part on the personal blog of US journalist Michael Balter who documented Rathjens prior history of sexual harassment, and was largely responsible for bringing the matter to the public's attention, and ultimately ICAC's. The ICAC Commissioner's damning findings against Rathjen have put the University of Adelaide's culture under intense scrutiny in both the local and international media.

Claiming ill-health, Rathjen formally resigned in July 2020 and, despite the ICAC Commissioner's findings, received a large payout from the university.

Organisation

The university is divided into three faculties, down from five in 2022. This is following a merger of the Arts faculty with the Professions faculty and the Faculty of Sciences with the Faculty of ECMS (Engineering, Computer, and Mathematical Sciences). Each faculty is made up of various constituent schools:

Faculty of Health and Medical Sciences
Adelaide Medical School
Adelaide Dental School
Adelaide Nursing School
School of Public Health
School of Psychology
School of Allied Health Science and Practice
School of Biomedicine
Adelaide Rural Clinical School

Faculty of Sciences, Engineering, and Technology
School of Agriculture, Food, and Wine
School of Physical Sciences
School of Biological Sciences
School of Animal and Veterinary Sciences
Australian School of Petroleum and Energy Resources
School of Chemical Engineering and Advanced Materials
School of Civil, Environmental & Mining Engineering
School of Computer Science
School of Electrical & Electronic Engineering
School of Mathematical Sciences
School of Mechanical Engineering
School of Architecture, and Built Environment

Faculty of Arts, Business, Law, and Economics
Elder Conservatorium of Music
School of Humanities
School of Education
School of Social Sciences
Adelaide Business School
School of Economics and Public Policy
Adelaide Law School.
The National Centre for Aboriginal Language and Music Studies (NCALMS) comprises three units: Kaurna Warra Pintyanthi (KWP), the Mobile Language Team (MLT), and the Centre for Aboriginal Studies in Music (CASM), which is within the Elder Conservatorium, and the "only devoted university-based centre for studies in Australian Indigenous music".

Wirltu Yarlu
The university has a long history of Indigenous education, establishing its first formal courses in the Centre for Aboriginal Studies in Music (CASM) in 1972. Wirltu Yarlu is a separate unit, which is "responsible for engaging with and recruiting Aboriginal and Torres Strait Islander people as well as providing support to students during their time [as students]".

Lecture series
The university hosts a number of lecture series, including the Joseph Fisher Lecture in Commerce, established in 1903 following a donation by politician and newspaper proprietor Joseph Fisher of £1000 to the university "for the purpose of promoting the study of commerce". The Gavin David Young Lectures in Philosophy began in 1956, owing their existence to a bequest made by Jessie Frances Raven, in memory of her father, for "the promotion, advancement, teaching and diffusion of the study of philosophy…".

The university also presents the James Crawford Biennial Lecture Series on International Law, named for James Richard Crawford SC, a graduate of the university who went on to be Dean of Law at the University of Sydney and subsequently Whewell Professor of International Law at the University of Cambridge. Crawford delivered the first lecture in 2004. The university is one of a number of institutions to have established an Edward Said Memorial Lecture. The first in this series was given in 2005.

Research

The University of Adelaide is one of the most research-intensive universities in Australia, securing over $180 million in research funding annually. Its researchers are active in both basic and commercially oriented research across a broad range of fields including agriculture, psychology, health sciences, and engineering.

Research strengths include engineering, mathematics, science, medical and health sciences, agricultural sciences, artificial intelligence, and the arts.

The university is a member of Academic Consortium 21, an association of 20 research intensive universities, mainly in Oceania, though with members from the US and Europe. The university held the Presidency of AC 21 for the period 2011–2013 as host the biennial AC21 International Forum in June 2012.

The Centre for Automotive Safety Research (CASR), based at the University of Adelaide, was founded in 1973 as the Road Accident Research Unit and focuses on road safety and injury control.

The University of Adelaide has capitalised on opportunities to commercialise its research. The university has the highest volume of commercial research agreements of all Australian universities. It engages in extensive contract research and collaborative work in conjunction with local and international companies, as well as federal, state and local governments. This activity is managed by the university's commercial development company, Adelaide Research & Innovation Pty Ltd (ARI).

Some examples of recent influences to the university's teaching and research priorities are the Defence Science and Technology Group (DSTG; previously the Defence Science and Technology Organisation, or DSTO) in Adelaide's northern suburbs to which the university provides many psychology, physics, engineering, and IT graduates; and the growth in South Australia's wine industry, which is supported by the Waite and National Wine Centre campuses producing oenology and agriculture/viticulture graduates.

In addition, the university participates in the Auto-ID Labs, a network of seven research universities in the field of networked radio-frequency identification (RFID) and emerging sensing technologies.

In August 2019, Primary Industries and Regions SA (PIRSA) and the South Australian Research and Development Institute (SARDI) entered a partnership with the university, in which scientists in diverse disciplines will be able to access PIRSA's research farms share their academic knowledge to the agricultural sector. The collaboration is anticipated to help develop SA's expertise in dryland agriculture, by encouraging multi-disciplinary research and help to bring about new export opportunities.

In 2020, the university partnered with SA Health to train Covid detector dogs.

Other university partners include the Royal Adelaide Hospital and the Hanson Institute.

In March 2022, the Australian Space Agency and the University of Adelaide stated that they would work together on space research.

Rankings

The University of Adelaide consistently features in the top 150 international universities as ranked by the Academic Ranking of World Universities, the QS World University Rankings, the Times Higher Education World University Rankings, and the U.S. News & World Report, situating it securely in the top 1% of ranked universities worldwide. The University of Adelaide ranked 90th in the 2022 Aggregate Ranking of Top Universities

Student life

Associations

As of 1 July 2006, membership of the Adelaide University Union (AUU) has been voluntary for all students, following the passing of voluntary student unionism (VSU) legislation by the Federal Government. The AUU funds five affiliates which carry out their functions autonomously. They are the Adelaide Postgraduate Students' Association (APGSA), the Clubs Association (CA), the Roseworthy Agricultural Campus Student Union Council (RACSUC), the Student Representative Council (preceded by the now defunct Students' Association of the University of Adelaide) and the Waite Institute Students' Association (WISA).

The Adelaide University Union was responsible for organising the annual Prosh (University of Adelaide) events.

Media
The University of Adelaide has three print news publications; these are:
 On Dit, the student magazine,
Adelaidean, the university's newspaper,
Lumen, the alumni magazine.

The University of Adelaide Press publishes staff scholarship and works of interest about the history and activities of the university. The Press is also responsible for publishing the Adelaide Law Review.

The University of Adelaide founded Australia's first community radio station, Radio Adelaide, in 1972.

Opportunities to participate in theatre productions are available through the University of Adelaide Theatre Guild and the Law School Revue.

Sports

Most university sport is organised by the Adelaide University Sports Association (AUSA). The Sports Association was founded in 1896 by the Adelaide University Boat, Tennis and Lacrosse Clubs. The Association disaffiliated from the Adelaide University Union (AUU) on 1 January 2010 and is currently directly affiliated to the University of Adelaide. The AUSA supports 37 sporting clubs which provide a diverse range of sporting opportunities to students of the University of Adelaide (AU). The AUSA is a major stakeholder in the AU North Terrace Campus based Sports Hub fitness centre and the North Adelaide-based university playing fields.

Venues

UniBar
The old UniBar was closed in 2018, with a new one opened in a new venue on the ground floor of Union House, in the former Mayo Cafe.

College Green
On 4 November 2020, a new venue known as the College Green, stretching from the Cloisters across the lawns down to Victoria Drive, next to the Torrens River. From opening night until New Year's Eve 2020/21, live bands, DJs, free open-air cinema, the South Australian Music Awards and Christmas markets were on the schedule. The move was partly in response to the impact of social distancing restrictions owing to the COVID-19 pandemic in Australia, which hit many live music venues.

Little Theatre
The Little Theatre is located in The Cloisters. It has seating for 120 people, and is used for dramatic performances by the University of Adelaide Theatre Guild as well as independent theatre companies, such as Rob Croser's Independent Theatre.

Scott Theatre
The Scott Theatre, as the largest lecture theatre on the North Terrace campus, is frequently hired out for performances of various kinds, such as for Adelaide Fringe events.

Notable people

The history of the University of Adelaide includes a large number of distinguished alumni and staff, including domestic and international heads of state; Nobel laureates; business and political leaders; pioneers in science, mathematics, and medicine; media personalities; accomplished musical, visual, performance, and written artists; and sportspeople, including multiple Olympic medallists.

Distinguished alumni include 16 chancellors, 20 vice-chancellors, 114 Rhodes Scholars, 5 Nobel laureates (one of whom was once the youngest laureate ever, Lawrence Bragg, co-recipient, with his father William Henry Bragg for physics in 1915, at 25 years of age), and one Prime Minister (Julia Gillard, the first female Prime Minister of Australia) have all graduated or attended the University of Adelaide.

Robin Warren, who alongside Barry Marshall, discovered that peptic ulcers were largely caused by the infection Helicobacter pylori, graduated from the university in the 1950s. Warren and Marshall won the Nobel Prize for their discovery in 2005. 

Other Nobel prizewinners are Howard Florey (pharmacologist and pathologist who shared the Nobel Prize in Physiology or Medicine in 1945 with Sir Ernst Chain and Sir Alexander Fleming for his role in the development of penicillin); and J.M. Coetzee (novelist and linguist, recipient of the 2003 Nobel Prize in Literature),

Other notable graduates and professors include Leo Blair (the father of British Prime Minister Tony Blair; law lecturer at the University of Adelaide while Tony was a child); Edward Charles Stirling (physiologist, politician and advocate for women's suffrage), Tim Flannery (Australian of the Year), Margaret Reid (first female president of the Australian Senate), Janine Haines (first female federal parliamentary leader of an Australian political party), Margaret White (first female judge of the Supreme Court of Queensland), Roma Mitchell (first female Queen's Counsel in Australia (1962), Justice of the Supreme Court of South Australia and the first female superior court judge in the British Commonwealth (1965) and first female state Governor), and Joni Madraiwiwi, Vice-President of the Republic of Fiji and Chief Justice of the Republic of Nauru.

See also

List of universities in Australia
The Environment Institute
University of Adelaide College, a pre-University pathways College for international students

References

External links

The University of Adelaide website
Adelaide University Union

 
Universities in South Australia
Educational institutions established in 1874
Australian vocational education and training providers
1874 establishments in Australia
Group of Eight (Australian universities)